Aeroflot Flight 366, also known as the Miracle on the Neva, was a water landing by a Tupolev Tu-124 of the Soviet state airline Aeroflot (Moscow division). The aircraft (registration number СССР-45021) was built in 1962 and was scheduled to fly to Moscow–Vnukovo (VKO) under the command of 27-year-old captain Victor Mostovoy. After takeoff the nose gear did not retract. Ground control diverted the flight to Leningrad (LED) – because of fog at Tallinn.

Events
The ground services at Pulkovo Airport (LED) were preparing the dirt runway for the landing. Each circuit around the city took the aircraft approximately 15 minutes. During this time the crew attempted to force the nose gear to lock into the fully extended position by pushing it with a pole taken from the cloak closet.

On the eighth and last circuit while  from the airport, the no. 1 engine flamed out due to fuel starvation. The remaining engine ceased shortly thereafter, with the aircraft above the city center, traveling east over St. Isaac's Cathedral and the Admiralty.

Eyewitnesses saw Flight 366 upstream. The Tu-124 flew over the Alexander Nevsky Bridge – under construction at the time – barely missing it. The pilot managed to land the aircraft on the river, in close proximity to an 1898-built steam tugboat.

The plane began to fill with water. The captain of the tugboat saw the plane in distress and went to help. He and his crew broke the aircraft's windshield to tie a cable to the cockpit's control wheel and proceeded to tow the craft to the river bank. During the tow all passengers remained on board. Passengers and crew then evacuated the cabin via an access hatch on the plane's roof.

See also
List of airline flights that required gliding
US Airways Flight 1549

References

External links
"Prepare to Ditch", in Flight International magazine, 13 August 1964, p241
"Soviet Transports" series, also Ditch or crash-land? B.W. Townshend, 1965 (pp 47–49)

Aviation accidents and incidents in 1963
Airliner accidents and incidents involving ditching
Aviation accidents and incidents in Russia
Aviation accidents and incidents in the Soviet Union
1963 in the Soviet Union
366
Accidents and incidents involving the Tupolev Tu-124
1960s in Leningrad
August 1963 events in Europe
Airliner accidents and incidents caused by fuel exhaustion
1963 in Russia